Ondrej Vrábel (born 23 April 1999) is a Slovak footballer who plays for FC ŠTK 1914 Šamorín as a midfielder.

Club career
Vrábel made his Fortuna Liga debut for Nitra against Žilina on 27 October 2018. IN the match, Vrábel had replaced Marián Chobot late in the game. Nitra lost 0-2.

References

External links
 FC Nitra official club profile 
 Futbalnet profile 
 
 

1999 births
Living people
Sportspeople from Topoľčany
Slovak footballers
Association football midfielders
FC Nitra players
FC ŠTK 1914 Šamorín players
Slovak Super Liga players